Pseudebulea fentoni is a moth in the family Crambidae. It was described by Arthur Gardiner Butler in 1881. It is found in Japan, Korea and the Russian Far East (Ussuri).

Subspecies
Pseudebulea fentoni fentoni
Pseudebulea fentoni koreensis Munroe & Mutuura, 1968 (Korea)
Pseudebulea fentoni sadoensis Munroe & Mutuura, 1968 (Japan: Honshu)
Pseudebulea fentoni ussuriensis Munroe & Mutuura, 1968 (Russia: Ussuri)
Pseudebulea fentoni yezoensis Munroe & Mutuura, 1968 (Japan: Hokkaido)

References

Moths described in 1881
Pyraustinae